William Cox Redfield (June 18, 1858 – June 13, 1932) was a Democratic politician from New York. He served as the first United States Secretary of Commerce from 1913 to 1919 after the division of the Department of Commerce and Labor. Previously, Redfield served as a U.S. Representative from New York from 1911 to 1913 and was an unsuccessful Democratic nominee for the vice presidency in 1912.

Publications

References

1858 births
1932 deaths
Politicians from Albany, New York
Politicians from Pittsfield, Massachusetts
United States Secretaries of Commerce
Woodrow Wilson administration cabinet members
20th-century American politicians
Democratic Party members of the United States House of Representatives from New York (state)